Moche can refer to:

Culture
Moche culture

Geography
Moche, Trujillo, a city in Peru
The Countryside of Moche
The Moche River
The Valley of Moche
Moche District, one of 11 districts of Trujillo Province

Food
Moche (food), also spelled mochi or muchi, a Filipino rice cake derived from Chinese-Filipino buchi (jian dui)

See also

Mocha